The 1919 Georgetown Blue and Gray football team represented Georgetown University during the 1919 college football season. Led by Albert Exendine in his sixth year as head coach, the team went 7–3 and won a South Atlantic Intercollegiate Athletic Association (SAIAA) championship.

Schedule

References

Georgetown
Georgetown Hoyas football seasons
South Atlantic Intercollegiate Athletic Association football champion seasons
Georgetown Blue and Gray football